Burcu Pirinçci, aka Burcu Dindar, (born February 8, 1990) is a Turkish women's handballer, who plays in the Turkish Women's Handball Super League for İzmir BB GSK, and the Turkey national team. The -tall sportswoman plays in the center back position.

Burcu Pirinçci married in 2013 to Hasan Dindar, a goalkeeper of the Yeni Bornovaspor football team.

She played for Anadolu University SK between 2005 and 2008 before she transferred to İzmir BB GSK.

She took part in the Women's EHF Cup Winners' Cups (2005–06, 2011–12 and 2012–13), Women's EHF Cup (2006–07, 2009–10 and 2010–11) as well as Women's EHF Challenge Cup (2007–08, 2008–09, 2014–15 and 2015–16).

References 

1990 births
People from Turgutlu
Turkish female handball players
İzmir Büyükşehir Belediyespor handball players
Turkey women's national handball players
Living people
21st-century Turkish sportswomen